The 2017 BWF World Senior Championships is a badminton tournament which was held from 11 to 17 September at Rajiv Gandhi Indoor Stadium in Kochi, India.

Players
663 players from 39 countries participated this edition of championships.

 (3)
 (6)
 (1)
 (8)
 (3)
 (3)
 (5)
 (2)
 (1)
 (3)
 (29)
 (68)
 (1)
 (39)
 (39)
 (1)
 (3)
 (4)
 (178) (H)
 (15)
 (3)
 (1)
 (48)
 (23)
 (1)
 (9)
 (5)
 (32)
 (3)
 (2)
 (1)
 (2)
 (1)
 (3)
 (24)
 (33)
 (11)
 (43)
 (6)

Medal summary

Medal table

Medalists

Players who won multiple medals

References

External links
Tournament link

 
BWF World Senior Championships
2017 in badminton
2017 in Indian sport
International sports competitions hosted by India
Badminton tournaments in India
Sport in Kochi
September 2017 sports events in Asia